Serare School is a privately owned co-educational day and boarding school located about  from the center of Nairobi, Kenya.

It is situated in the peri-urban area between the Karen shopping centre and Ngong township.

History and operations
The school started on 11 January 1988.

It follows the Kenyan 8-4-4 curriculum, which is offered to students from kindergarten to high school level.

The school has three sections – kindergarten, primary school and high school. The kindergarten and primary are co-educational with a firm Christian foundation, whilst the high school section is only for girls. Boarding facilities are available for both the primary and high school sections.

See also

 Christianity in Africa
 Education in Kenya
 List of boarding schools
 List of schools in Kenya
 Religion in Kenya

External links 
 , the school's official website

1988 establishments in Kenya
Boarding schools in Kenya
Christian schools in Kenya
Co-educational boarding schools
Educational institutions established in 1988
Girls' schools in Kenya
Elementary and primary schools in Kenya
Private schools in Kenya
Schools in Nairobi
High schools and secondary schools in Kenya